Pomacentrus polyspinus, commonly known as the Thai damsel, is a fish native to the Andaman Sea and eastern Indian Ocean.

References

External links
 

polyspinus
Fish of Thailand
Fish described in 1991
Fish of the Indian Ocean
Taxa named by Gerald R. Allen